Charaxes martini is a butterfly in the family Nymphalidae. It is found in Malawi. The habitat consists of riparian forests.

The larvae feed on Diospyros natalensis natalensis.

Taxonomy
Charaxes martini is a member of the large species group Charaxes etheocles.

Subspecies
Charaxes martini martini (Malawi: Mount Mlanje)
Charaxes martini helenae Henning, 1982  (Malawi: west and north of the Zomba Plateau)

References

Victor Gurney Logan Van Someren, 1966 Revisional notes on African Charaxes (Lepidoptera: Nymphalidae). Part III. Bulletin of the British Museum (Natural History) (Entomology) 45-101.
 Van Someren, 1974 Revisional notes on African Charaxes (Lepidoptera: Nymphalidae). Part IX. Bulletin of the British Museum of Natural History (Entomology) 29 (8):415-487.  Additional notes

External links
Charaxes martini martini images at Consortium for the Barcode of Life

Butterflies described in 1966
martini
Endemic fauna of Malawi
Butterflies of Africa